Vespomima nigrotaenia is a species of ulidiid or picture-winged fly in the genus Vespomima of the family Ulidiidae.

References

Ulidiidae